St. Francis DeSales High School is located in Columbus, Ohio, United States and is part of the Catholic Diocese of Columbus.  The school has an enrollment of over 875 students, in four grade levels.

Location
St. Francis DeSales High School is located on the north side of Columbus, Ohio. Students come from the Columbus Public School District and suburban school districts: Big Walnut, Delaware, Gahanna Jefferson, Lewis Center, New Albany-Plain Local, Olentangy, Westerville and Worthington.

History
St. Francis DeSales High School was originally founded in 1960, using borrowed classrooms from both St. Augustine and St. James the Less schools. During September 1962, the school earned a permanent home. It had ten sisters from St. Francis of Stella in Niagara, New York, four priests, and eight lay people. It opened with a registered student number of 523.

Awards
St. Francis DeSales High School is the recipient of two Blue Ribbon Awards of Excellence in Education.

Extracurriculars 
Over 90% of the students are involved in the arts, athletics, student government, or one of the many clubs and organizations offered on campus. The school offers Latin Club, Italian Club, French Club, Spanish Club, Chinese Club, Business Club, Engineering Club, St. Vincent DePaul, a National Honors Society chapter, Drama Club, Art Club, Student Council, Model UN Club, Mock Trial, Environmental Club, Corral for the Kids (benefits pediatric cancer patients), Run the Race Club (benefits Brian Muha Foundation), Ronald McDonald Baking Club, Rosary Making Club, Equus Literary Magazine, Math Club, Chemistry Club, Horizons (Liturgical Choir), Band, Flag Corps, Writing Club, Wrestling Stats, In-the-Know, History Club, Ski Club, Yoga Club, Student Ambassadors, Stallions for Health & Wellness, and Fishing Club.

Since 2021, catechesis at the school has been facilitated by Salesian Sisters of Don Bosco.

Athletics

 Football - 1985, 1997, 1998
 Wrestling - 1971, 1974, 1977 
 Basketball – 1987 
 Baseball - 1979, 2011, 2012 
 Boys Soccer - 1986, 1992, 1997, 2009, 2014, 2015, 2017 
 Girls Soccer - 1995, 1997, 1998, 2011 
 Girls Volleyball - 1982, 2019 
 Boys Gymnastics - 1990, 1991, 1992, 1993
 Boys Lacrosse- 2012, 2018, 2022

Notable alumni/staff

 Elijah Allen, professional basketball player
 Ikechi Ariguzo, former NFL player
 Brian Asamoah, NFL Player
 Gary Berry, former NFL player
 Tim Bezbatchenko, President of Columbus Crew
 Antonio Daniels, former NBA player
 Matt D'Orazio, former AFL player
 Luke Fickell, head football coach at University of Wisconsin, former co-defensive coordinator for Ohio State
 Jane Grote-Abell, chairwoman of Donatos Pizza
 Paul Haynes, Defensive backs coach at Michigan State Spartans football
 John Holgado, bass guitarist for post-hardcore band Attack Attack!
 Patrick Omameh, professional football player
 Matt Stewart, former NFL player
 Blaine Wilson, Olympic silver medalist in gymnastics

References

Saint Francis DeSales Columbus
Saint Francis DeSales Columbus
Roman Catholic Diocese of Columbus